Baghdasar Arzoumanian (1916 - 2001) was an Armenian architect and designer based in Yerevan, Armenia. He designed a large body of civil and religious buildings as well as many smaller works.

Education and background 
Arzoumanian was born in Mutsk, Syunik Province, Armenia. From 1928 to 1936 he studied at the Technical School. In 1938 he was admitted to the Constructions Department of the Institute for Polytechnical Sciences of Yerevan. In 1942 he entered the Soviet army and took part in World War II. He served in the army until 1946 when he returned to Yerevan to continue his studies. He graduated from the Institute in 1949.

During his professional career he worked with the Yerevan Project Institute and the Armenian Church headquarters in Etchmiadzin.

He died on November 19, 2001 in Yerevan.

Civil buildings
Arzoumanian is the architect of many civil buildings in Armenia. Below are some of his most important buildings:
 City hall of Vanadzor and Hotel Gougark in  the Hayk Square (then known as Kirov Square) of the city of Vanadzor, completed during the 1950s (co-architect: Hovhannes Margarian).
 Erebuni Museum (1968, co-architect: Shmavon Azatian).
 Museum dedicated to 2450th anniversary of establishment of Samarkand, Uzbekistan (now the Samarkand Museum of History)
 Metro Station "David of Sasoun",  (co-architects: Sargis Nersisian and Areg Israyelian).
 Degustation Hall of the Yerevan Brandy Factory (co-architects: Sargis Nersisian and Hasmik Alexanian).
 Yerevan Cable-way Station.

Arzoumanian is architect or co-architect of the RA Police building in Yerevan, various apartment buildings, reconstruction of Moscow Cinema in Yerevan. He is the architect of memorials to the victory in World War II in various parts of Armenia.

Etchmiadzin (1956–2001)

Early works
 Vanatoon (Monastic Residence) – 1978
 Alex and Marie Manoogian Museum – 1982

Design works

Khachkars and memorials
Arzoumanian designed many khachkars (Armenian stone crosses) and memorials. Many of them are in Etchmiadzin (i.e. the Motherland-Diaspora Memorial).
He is also the architect of a memorial in the monastery of Geghard, and a memorial and khachkars next to the Prelacy of the Araratian Patriarchal Diocese.

Jewellery works
His Golden Alphabet (1976) and Golden Cross (1979) are kept in the Pontifical Residence of the Catholicos of All Armenians.
Among his other works are:
 State Emblem of the Soviet Armenia (1981)
 Souvenir dedicated to the 30th anniversary of service of Vasken I, Catholicos of All Armenians (1985)

The list also includes various crosiers, rings, the liturgical dressing of the Catholicos of All Armenians.
Arzoumanian is the designer of catholicosal medals St. Gregory the Illuminator, St. Sahak – St. Mesrop, and St. Nerses Shnorhali (Nerses the Gracious).

Interior design

Baghdasar Arzoumanian is the author of the Throne Hall of the Catholicos of All Armenians.

Iconostases
Besides iconostases of the churches of his own design, Arzoumanian is the author of the iconostases of following churches:
 St. Sarkis Vicarial Church of Yerevan, Armenia (authors of renovation: Rafayel Israyelian and Artsrun Galikyan),
 St. Catherine Armenian Church of Saint Petersburg, Russia.

Graphical works
Arzoumanian also designed graphics which include the design of Etchmiadzin Monthly, Catholicosal Decrees, and book designs. He is the graphical designer and the author of the text of the book "Armenian Churches".

Tombstones
Baghasar Arzoumanian designed the tombstones of:
 Vazgen I, Catholicos of All Armenians,
 Karekin I, Catholicos of All Armenians,
 Saint Mesrob Mashtots.

Other works
Baghdasar Arzoumanian is the author of the "Dpratoun" building in Oshakan, Armenia. He is also the designer of the entrance door of the Residence of the Catholicos of All Armenians.

Churches
Baghdasar Arzoumanian is the architect of 8 Armenian churches and 2 renovation projects.

Renovation projects
Arzoumanian is the author of renovation of the following churches:
 St. John the Baptist Church of Yerevan (entire renovation and the bell-tower),
 St. Gregory the Illuminator Church of the Kinali Island, Turkey.

New churches
Arzoumanian is the architect of the following churches:
 St. Gregory the Illuminator Armenian Church in Odessa, Ukraine (1995),
 St. Sarkis Church of Nork District of Yerevan, Armenia (1999),
 Holy Resurrection Church of Nerkin Dvin, Armenia,
 Holy Resurrection Church of Spitak, Armenia (1999),
 Holy Martyrs Church of Kashatagh, Nagorno-Karabakh Republic (2002, the church was consecrated after his death),
 St. Hakob (James) Church of Gyumri, Armenia (2002, the church was consecrated after his death),
 St. Hakob (James) Church of the Vaskenian Theological Academy near Sevan, Armenia
 Holy Trinity Church of Yerevan, Armenia (2005, the church was consecrated after his death).

Medals and awards
 St. Gregory the Illuminator Medal
 Golden Medal of the Academy of Arts of the USSR (1991)
 Title of Merited Constructor of Armenia (1966)

Arzoumanian also holds medals for his military career during World War II (2nd Order Medal of the Patriotic War, Red Star Medal, Medal of Honour, Medal of Bravery, Medal for Victory against Germany, Medal for Taking Kyoniksberg, Medal of Marshal Baghramian).

Gallery

Bibliography
 There are 30 bibliographical references in the book of Varazdat Harutyunyan devoted to Baghdasar Arzoumanian: .
  
 , Google Translation.

Films

See also
  (April 2007, in Armenian)

Notes

References

1916 births
2001 deaths
Architects from Yerevan
People from Syunik Province
Soviet architects